Future From The Past is the first studio album by indie rock band Scarlet Sails, released in April 2017. The album was recorded in late 2016.

The album was released after a successful Kickstarter campaign, funded by nearly 200% in March 2017. The songs were all written by singer Olya Viglione throughout the course of her living in New York City, having moved there from Moscow, Russia in 2011. When explaining the meaning behind the album title, Olya said that “all the songs symbolized different things and we wanted to put it all together. So future from the past is sort of like the best way to kind of sum it all up.” As Brian explains it, “the future from the past is now. The present, the image that you project of yourself when you were a small kid or the dreams that you have. You arrive finally at that moment and you look back from what you can from those past experiences and you try to create what you can and manifest the things that you hope for and worked for in your present.”

One of the incentives for the Kickstarter campaign was for their supporters to be in their music video for the song "Spell My Name", which was released on August 1, 2017.

Explaining the concept of the album, Brian stated that they wanted “the power and grandiosity of Queen, the dark and raw maniacal twist of Bob Ezrin-era Alice, and the spacious sonic pallet of Radiohead” all to come out in the recording.

Track listing

Personnel
Olya Viglione - vocals, piano, keyboards
Brian Viglione - drums, percussion, vocals, bass guitar, acoustic guitar
Mark Christopher Kohut - electric guitar 
Jesse Krakow - bass guitar 
Brian Viglione - producer
Nic Hard - mixer
Diko Shoturma, Daniel Pasquel, and Matthias Anton - engineering
Greg Calbi - mastering

References

2017 debut albums